Paul Gruber (born October 26, 1996), is an American professional wrestler better known by his ring name Wheeler Yuta (sometimes stylized as Wheeler YUTA). He is currently signed to All Elite Wrestling (AEW), where he is the current ROH Pure Champion in his record-setting second reign. He is a member of the Blackpool Combat Club stable, and in addition to appearing for AEW, he also makes appearances in Ring of Honor (ROH, AEW's sister promotion), and Japan's New Japan Pro-Wrestling (NJPW), where he was formerly a member of Chaos.

Early life
Yuta is the son of an American Master chief petty officer in the US Navy and his Japanese wife, whom he met while in service. Yuta was born in Hawaii before his family moved to South Carolina, then returned to his father's native Philadelphia.

Professional wrestling career

Early career (2014–2020)
Yuta debuted in 2014. He made his Combat Zone Wrestling (CZW) debut in late 2015 and consistently appeared for CZW until late 2016. On October 5, 2017, at One Shot, he made his debut for Major League Wrestling (MLW) in a losing effort to MJF. His last match for the promotion would be in 2019 against Low-Ki.

Ring of Honor (2020, 2022–present)
Yuta made his debut for Ring of Honor (ROH) in the first round of the ROH Pure Tournament, where he was defeated by Jonathan Gresham.

After Tony Khan's purchase of Ring of Honor, it was announced that Yuta would face Josh Woods at the revived Supercard of Honor XV for the ROH Pure Championship. At the event, Yuta defeated Woods to win the title. On the May 24, 2022 episode of Dark, which aired almost two months after their bout at Supercard of Honor XV, Yuta would successfully defend the ROH Pure Championship against Woods in a rematch. Yuta once again defended the title on the June 29 episode of Dark, defeating Tony Nese. After the match, Yuta was attacked by 2point0 and Daniel Garcia. This led to a match between Garcia and Yuta for the title at Death Before Dishonor, in which Yuta successfully retained the championship. Yuta lost the title on the September 7 episode of Dynamite to Garcia, ending his reign at 159 days. On December 10, 2022 Yuta regained the ROH Pure Championship during Ring of Honor Final Battle.

All Elite Wrestling (2021–present)

On the June 29, 2021 episode of Dark: Elevation, Yuta made his debut for All Elite Wrestling (AEW) against Karl Anderson, and would consistently appear on AEW's YouTube shows throughout the coming months. Yuta also joined Best Friends, where he filled in for the injured Trent Beretta in trios matches. On the November 10 episode of Dynamite, Rocky Romero announced that Best Friends would become a sub-group within NJPW stable Chaos, and they would represent the stable in AEW. On the March 30, 2022 episode of Dynamite, after Yuta was defeated by Bryan Danielson, he teased to join the Blackpool Combat Club stable. The April 8 episode of Rampage saw Yuta lose in a hard-fought match to Jon Moxley, which led to him joining the BCC, after being welcomed by the leader William Regal.

On the March 8 2023 episode of Dynamite, after Moxley and Claudio Castagnoli defeated The Dark Order members John Silver and Alex Reynolds, Yuta along with Moxley and Castagnoli beat down Hangman Page, thus turning heel for the first time in his AEW career.

New Japan Pro-Wrestling (2021–present)
In April 2021, Yuta made his debut for New Japan Pro-Wrestling (NJPW) with the promotion's American subsidiary, appearing on NJPW Strong. On May 1, 2022, Yuta was announced to be competing in the 29th Best of the Super Juniors tournament as part of the B Block. Yuta finished with a record of five wins and four losses, resulting in 10 points, failing to advance to the finals. On the tournament finals day, Yuta, Ace Austin, Alex Zayne and El Lindaman defeated Robbie Eagles, Yoh, Clark Connors and Titán in a tag-team match.

Pro Wrestling Guerrilla (2022–present)
In January 2022, Yuta made his debut for Pro Wrestling Guerrilla (PWG) at the Battle of Los Angeles. He defeated Blake Christian in the first round, but would lose the second round match to Mike Bailey.

Championships and accomplishments
Chikara
Chikara Young Lions Cup (1 time)
Combat Zone Wrestling
Dramatic Destination Series (2016)
Trifecta (2018)
Dojo Pro Wrestling
Dojo Pro White Belt Championship (1 time)
NOVA Pro Wrestling
Men's Commonwealth Cup (2018)
Pro Wrestling Illustrated
Ranked No. 43 of the top 500 singles wrestlers in the PWI 500 in 2022
Powerbomb.tv
IWTV Independent Wrestling World Championship (1 time)
Ring of Honor
ROH Pure Championship (2 time, Current)

References

External links
 
 
 
 

1996 births
Living people
People from Philadelphia
Professional wrestlers from Pennsylvania
American male professional wrestlers
American people of Japanese descent
All Elite Wrestling personnel
21st-century professional wrestlers